Theodegotha (5th-century – fl. 502) was a Visigoth queen consort by marriage to king Alaric II (494–507).

She was the daughter of Theodoric the Great. Her marriage was arranged as an alliance between the Visigoths and the Ostrogoths, though it is disputed when it took place and therefore the exact reasons for the alliance. She was the mother of Amalaric.

References 

Visigothic queens consort
6th-century people of the Visigothic Kingdom
5th-century women
6th-century women